The siege of Samarkand was a military engagement fought in Samarkand, Uzbekistan in 1868 between the Russian Empire and a combined army of forces from the Bokharan Emirate, and several Uzbek tribes. During the engagement, a Russian garrison successfully repelled multiple attempts by the besieging allied army to storm the city. The Russian victory solidified imperial control over the new state of Russian Turkestan, and caused the partial collapse of the Bokharan Emirate.

History

Background 
In the mid 19th-century, the Russian Empire conducted several military campaigns in Central Asia. The intent of these campaigns was to suppress hostile Muslim nations and to expand the Russian Empire.

In 1864, war broke out between Russia and the Kokand Khanate. The Kokandi forces were quickly defeated by the Russian army, causing the amir of Bukhara—who feared a Russian victory over Kokand would allow the empire to establish a foothold in the region—to join the war against Russia. Despite facing logistical issues, the Russian army inflicted a series of defeats on the combined Kokandi-Bukharan forces, and by 1867 both Kokand and Bukhara were forced to cede territory to the Russian Empire; these ceded territories were then incorporated into the Russian province of Turkestan, which was put under the governance of General Konstantin von Kaufmann.

Despite the end of the Ruso-Bukharan War and the signing of a peace treaty, fighting continued in parts of the new Russian province. Seeking to crush these forces (which Kaufamnn correctly suspected of being supported by the Bukharans in violation of the earlier peace treaty), Kaufmann organized an army and marched on the Bukharan-controlled city of Samarkand, which he successfully captured in 1868. However, the capture of the city did not cause the end of the fighting, and so Kaufmann chose to pursue a force of retreating Bukarans to the city of Bukhara, leaving a small garrison of 685 men to hold Samarkand. This garrison force was not entirely combat ready, and many of the men Kaufmann left behind were either wounded or non-combatants.

Siege 
The departure of the main body of Kaufmann's army left Samarkand vulnerable. Seizing upon this weakness, nearby holdouts of Kokandi, Bukharan soldiers, and anti-Russian tribes consolidated their forces and marched on the lightly-defended city. The Russian garrison received word of the approaching enemy forces, and prepared for a siege. The commander of the garrison, Baron Shtempel, withdrew his forces from more vulnerable parts of the city to defend Samarkand's citadel; this position was highly defensible, armed with 25 cannon captured from the Bukharans and stocked with provisions for two months. Shtempel's Russian forces were supplemented by a number of Jewish and Iranian inhabitants of the city, most of whom opposed the return of the Bukharan government and feared reprisal if the city was retaken. The allied army opposing the Russians was made up of Bukharans, Kokandi, several pro-Bukaran tribes, and many townspeople from Samarkand.

The Bukaran forces laid siege to the citadel, and over three days succeeded in making several breaches in the fortification's walls. However, all attempts to storm the citadel were repulsed by the Russian defenders. Several Russian officers distinguished themselves during these engagements; one Russian officer by the name of Nazarov (who had previously been well-known for being a heavy drinker and poor gambler) distinguished himself during the siege, while future Russian war artist Vasily Vereshchagin was commended (being awarded the Cross of St. George) for his actions.

As the siege progressed, word reached Kaufmann's main force that Samarkand was under attack. The general quickly marshaled his forces and conducted a forced march to relieve the city. Threatened by the approach of the Russian army, the besiegers retreated, ending the siege. The Russian garrison had suffered heavy casualties, with 221 men having been killed or wounded.

Aftermath 
Following the Russian victory at Samarkand, the Amir of Bukhara was forced to sue for peace. More territory was ceded to the Russian Empire, and in the following years a civil war broke out in Bukhara as a result of the Amir's political weakness.

In addition to solidifying the Russian Empire's control over Russian Turkestan, the victory at Samarkand was seen by the Russian army as a symbol of Russia's renewed heroism and martial prowess—both had previously been tested by the Russian defeat in the Crimean War.

References 

Conflicts in 1868
Sieges involving Russia
History of Samarkand